Musashi, the Samurai Lord, known in Japanese as , is an anime series by Studio Pierrot. The 50-episode series aired on Nippon Television from October 1990 to September 1991.

The series stars, Musashi, a "gimmick robot". In the country of Zipangu every person has a gimmick robot. Musashi battles and meets his rival, Kojiro (a reference to the historical battle between Miyamoto Musashi and Sasaki Kojirō).

Two video games were released based on the anime.

Characters

See also
 
 Miyamoto Musashi in fiction

References

External links
 
 
 Karakuri Kengō Den Musashi Lord (video game) at Giant Bomb
 Musashi, the Samurai Lord at Studio Pierrot 

1990 anime television series debuts
1991 video games
Game Boy games
Japan-exclusive video games
Nintendo Entertainment System games
Nippon TV original programming
Pierrot (company)
Tose (company) games
Video games based on anime and manga
Video games developed in Japan
Video games set in Japan
Yutaka games

Mecha anime and manga
Video games about mecha